Surender may refer to:

Surender Reddy, Tollywood film director
Surender Mohan Pathak, author
Surender Pal Singh, member of Bharatiya Janata Party (BJP) from Rajasthan
Surender Pal Ratawal, leader of Bharatiya Janata Party from Delhi
Surender Singh Barwala, BJP politician from Hisar, Haryana

See also
 S. N. Surendar (born 1953), Indian playback singer, actor and voice actor
 Surendar Valasai (born 1968), Pakistani journalist
Surrender (disambiguation)

Indian given names